Koundougou is a department or commune of Houet Province in Burkina Faso.

References 

Departments of Burkina Faso
Houet Province